Digama budonga is a moth of the family Erebidae. It is found in Uganda.

External links
 Species info

Aganainae
Lepidoptera of Uganda
Lepidoptera of Malawi
Moths of Sub-Saharan Africa
Moths described in 1913